Joynt is an Irish surname of Huguenot origin meaning graceful or slim.

Carol Joynt, American author and television interviewer
Chris Joynt (born 1971), English rugby league footballer 
Hartley Joynt (1938–2021), Australian cricketer
Henry Joynt (born 1931), English first-class cricketer
John W. Joynt (1899–1975), American politician
Maud Joynt (1868–1940), Irish Celtic scholar and linguist
Rachel Joynt (born 1966), Irish sculptor
Robert Joynt (1856–1938), Anglican priest and author
Robert L. Joynt (1845–1931), Canadian merchant and political figure
Thomas Joynt (1830–1907), New Zealand law barrister 
William Joynt (1889–1986), Australian war-decorated soldier, farmer, printer, publisher and author

References

See also
William Lane-Joynt (1824–1895) Irish administrator, Mayor of Limerick (1862) and Lord Mayor of Dublin 
William Russell Lane-Joynt (1855–1921), Irish barrister, philatelist and Olympic shooter
Michael Scott-Joynt (1943–2014), English bishop and prelate